Kaliyattam is a 1997 Indian Malayalam-language tragedy film directed by Jayaraaj. It stars Suresh Gopi, Lal (in his acting debut), Manju Warrier, and Biju Menon. The film is an adaptation of William Shakespeare's play Othello, set against the backdrop of the Theyyam performance of Kerala. The film's screenplay is written by Balram Mattannur. Suresh Gopi plays Kannan Perumalayan, the equivalent to Othello. Lal plays Paniyan, the equivalent to Iago. Manju Warrier plays Thamara, the Desdemona version. And Biju Menon plays Kanthan, Cassio's role. Suresh Gopi's role as Kannan Perumalayan was critically acclaimed and it was considered one of his finest acting performances in his career.

In 1998, Suresh Gopi received the National Film Award for Best Actor and Kerala State Film Award for Best Actor for his critically acclaimed performance. Jayaraaj won the award for Best Director for his work on the film. The film was a critical and commercial success.

Plot
This is an adaptation of Shakespeare's Othello, revolving around Kannan Perumalayan (Suresh Gopi), a Theyyam artist who corresponds to Othello, and Thamara (Manju Warrier), the beautiful daughter of the village head. While Unni Thampuran hates Kannan because he had a crush on Thamara, and Paniyan, (Lal) who plays a Komali, covets the role of Theechamundi which Perumalayan holds. Paniyan plants the seeds of doubt about Thamara's fidelity in Kannan's mind, making him suspect that Thamara and his assistant Kanthan (Biju Menon) are having an affair. Kannan spots a silk robe which he had presented to Thamara in Kanthan's hands.

Kannan, out of grief and anger, takes Thamara's life by suffocating her with a pillow. On the same night, Paniyan plans to get Kanthan killed by Unni Thampuran, but the plan goes awry and Thamburan is killed. Amidst these events, Kannan is told of his mistake by Paniyan's wife Cheerma, before Paniyan murders her. Kannan overpowers Paniyan, crushing his legs with a stone, and allows him to live the rest of his life crippled. Kannan Perumalayan gives the ''Perumalayan'' role to Kanthan and commits suicide in the Theyyam ritual fire.

Cast

 Suresh Gopi as Kannan Perumalayan (Othello)
 Lal as Paniyan (Iago)
 Manju Warrier as Thamara (Desdemona)
 Biju Menon as Kanthan (Cassio)
 Bindu Panicker as Cheerma (Emilia)
 Narendra Prasad as Thamburan (Brabantio)
 E. A. Rajendran as Unni Thampuran (Roderigo)

Awards
National Film Awards 1997
 National Film Award for Best Director - Jayaraaj
 National Film Award for Best Actor - Suresh Gopi

Filmfare Awards 1997
 Filmfare Award for Best Director - Malayalam - Jayaraj
 Filmfare Award for Best Music Director - Malayalam - Kaithapram

Kerala State Film Awards 1997
 Kerala State Film Award for Best Actor - Suresh Gopi
 Best Film with Popular Appeal and Aesthetic Value
 Best Music Director - Kaithapram
 Best Female Playback Singer -Bhavana Radhakrishnan

Kerala Film Critics Association Awards 1997
Best Actor - Suresh Gopi
Best Supporting Actor - Lal

Soundtrack

The music and lyrics were composed and written by Kaithapram Damodaran Namboothiri.

References

External links
 

1997 films
1990s Malayalam-language films
Films based on Othello
Films shot in Palakkad
Films featuring a Best Actor National Award-winning performance
Films scored by Kaithapram Viswanathan Namboothiri
Films whose director won the Best Director National Film Award